Hôpital Tenon is a hospital located at 4, rue de la Chine in the 20th arrondissement of Paris. It is part of the Assistance Publique – Hôpitaux de Paris (AP-HP) and the university hospital group AP-HP-Sorbonne University. It is particularly well known for its services in the fields of urology, pneumology, gynecology, and interventional radiology. It is accredited by the Haute Autorité de santé.

The hospital bears the name of the surgeon Jacques-René Tenon (1724-1816).

References

External links

Hôpital Tenon

Hospitals in Paris
Buildings and structures completed in 1878
Hospital buildings completed in the 19th century
Teaching hospitals in France
Buildings and structures in the 20th arrondissement of Paris
Hospitals established in the 19th century
1878 establishments in France